Rubi Kumari Karn is a Nepalese politician who is elected member of Provincial Assembly of Madhesh Province from CPN (Maoist Centre). Karn is a resident of Khadak, Saptari.

References

External links

Living people
1981 births
21st-century Nepalese women politicians
21st-century Nepalese politicians
Members of the Provincial Assembly of Madhesh Province
People from Saptari District
Communist Party of Nepal (Maoist Centre) politicians